Michael Deane may refer to:

 Michael Deane (chef) (born 1961), chef from Northern Ireland
 Michael Deane (journalist) (1951–2013), British journalist and cameraman
 Michael Deane (cricketer) (born 1977), English cricketer
 Mike Deane (born 1951), American college basketball coach

See also
 Michael Dean (disambiguation)